Rajit Kapur  is an Indian film and theatre actor and director. He is known for his portrayal of Mahatma Gandhi in the 1996 film, The Making of the Mahatma for which he won the National Film Award for Best Actor. Other notable roles are as the protagonist Unni in the Malayalam film Agnisakshi, and the fictional detective Byomkesh Bakshi in the eponymous television series, directed by Basu Chatterjee and broadcast on Doordarshan. His debut film was Suraj Ka Satvan Ghoda (1992), directed by Shyam Benegal.

Career

Rajit Kapur played the role of the famous Bengali detective Byomkesh Bakshi in the eponymously named TV series, Byomkesh Bakshi (1993). Byomkesh Bakshi is a fictitious character created by the popular Bengali writer Sharadindu Bandyopadhyay. Basu Chatterjee directed a TV show based on the stories of Bandyopadhyay, and Rajit Kapur played the lead role. The show was very popular and Rajit Kapur achieved his first media recognition through this show. Kapur is also a very prominent theatre actor and director in India. 
He acted in Malayalam film Agnisakshi in 1999 which won numerous acclodes including National Film Award for Best Feature Film in Malayalam, and he was awarded Kerala State Film Award for Best Actor.
He has also acted in several commercially successful movies like Kick, Uri: The Surgical Strike, and Raazi. His latest work is The Threshold.

Filmography

Plays

 Love Letters
 Class of '84
 Larins Sahib
 Are There Tigers in the Congo?
 Mr. Behram
 Six Degrees of Separation
 Pune Highway
 Me Kash and Cruise
 Flowers
 A Walk In The Woods
 One on One Part 2
 The Siddhus of Upper Juhu
 Mahua (as director)

Television series

Awards
1996: National Film Award for Best Actor - The Making of the Mahatma
1998: Kerala State Film Award for Best Actor - Agnisakshi
2010: Imagine India Film Festival, Spain, Award for Best Actor - Do Paise Ki Dhoop, Chaar Aane Ki Baarish

References

External links
 

Indian male film actors
Best Actor National Film Award winners
Living people
Male actors in Hindi cinema
Male actors from Amritsar
1960 births